The 2016–17 Premier League of Bosnia and Herzegovina, known as Liga 12 and also known as BH Telecom Premier League for sponsorship reasons, is the seventeenth season of the Premier League of Bosnia and Herzegovina, the highest football league of Bosnia and Herzegovina. The season began on 23 July 2016 and will conclude on 28 May 2017, with a winter break between early December 2016 and late February 2017. The official fixture schedule was released on 24 June 2016.

Teams
A total of 12 teams will contest the league, including 10 sides from the 2015–16 season and two promoted from each of the second-level league.

Stadiums and locations

Personnel and kits

Note: Flags indicate national team as has been defined under FIFA eligibility rules. Players and Managers may hold more than one non-FIFA nationality.

Managerial changes

Regular season

In contrast to previous seasons, this season has a two-stage format. In the regular season, each of the 12 teams play home-and-away once, resulting in 22 games played each. The top six teams in the regular season qualify for the Championship round, the bottom six teams qualify for the Relegation round. Each team then plays home-and-away against the other teams within their own group, for an additional ten games played each, a season total of 32 games.

Results

Championship round

Results

Relegation round

Results

Top goalscorers

Attendances

References

External links
Official site for the Football Federation of Bosnia and Herzegovina

2016-17
Bosnia
1